Glynn Juwan Watson Jr. (born March 9, 1997) is an American professional basketball player for CBet Jonava of the Lithuanian Basketball League (LKL). He played four years of college basketball with the Nebraska Cornhuskers of the Big Ten Conference. A consensus top 100 recruit out of high school, Watson became Nebraska's first four-star and Rivals Top 150 signee in program history.

High school career

Watson played for legendary high school coach Gene Pingatore at St. Joseph High School in Westchester, Illinois. As a senior, he averaged 15.5 points, 4.3 rebounds, 4.0 assists, and 3.0 steals per game in leading the Chargers to a 29-6 record and the school's second state title. In all, Watson had nine games of at least 20 points as a senior. For his efforts, he earned first-team all-state honors from the Illinois Basketball Coaches Association and Champaign News-Gazette in 2015. In addition, Watson was a second-team choice by the Chicago Tribune (all classes) and Chicago Sun Times (Class 3A). Watson played summer ball for the Illinois Wolves, one of the top AAU teams in the region.

Recruitment
A consensus four-star prospect, Watson was ranked among the top 100 players in the country by every recruiting service and was ranked as high as 66 nationally by Scout.com, which also ranked him as the seventh-best point guard in the class of 2015, and No. 73 on ESPN.com’s top-100 seniors. He received offers from Creighton, DePaul, Iowa, Marquette, Maryland, Nebraska, Penn State, Purdue, Tennessee, and West Virginia. Watson committed to Nebraska on August 31, 2014, two days after taking his first and only official visit to Nebraska.

College career

Freshman year
Watson started the 2015-2016 season coming off the bench for the Cornhuskers. In his collegiate debut, Watson played 22 minutes, tallying six points, three rebounds, three assists, and two steals in Nebraska's victory over Mississippi Valley State.  
On December 1, 2015, in his eighth collegiate game, Watson hit a game-tying three-pointer with 18.9 seconds left to send the Cornhuskers and then 21st ranked Miami (FL) to overtime.  On December 13, 2015, Watson scored 13 of his career-high 17 points in the second half to lead the Cornhuskers back from an 11-point deficit to defeat Rhode Island. Watson made his first career start on December 22, 2015 against Prairie View A&M and has been a fixture in the Cornhuskers' starting lineup since.  The Illinois native reached double figures in six of his first 11 conference games, including an impressive 17 point performance in Nebraska's victory at Illinois. On February 15, 2016, Watson was named Big Ten Conference Freshman of the Week, becoming the first Cornhusker to win the award since Shavon Shields in February 2013.

Sophomore year

Watson opened the 2016-2017 season with a career high 23 points in the Cornhuskers 83-61 victory over Sacramento State. As a sophomore, Watson averaged 13 points, 3.0 rebounds, and 2.6 assists per game.

Junior year
As a junior, Watson averaged 10.5 points and 3.2 assists per game.

Senior year
As a senior, Watson averaged 13.6 points, 4.1 rebounds, and 3.1 assists per game. He helped Nebraska reach its second straight NIT. He had five 20-point games and averaged 18.9 points per game in his final nine games. Watson finished his career with 1,532 points, 11th in program history. After the season, he participated in the 2019 Dos Equis 3X3U National Championship.

Career statistics

College

|-
| style="text-align:left;"| 2015–16
| style="text-align:left;"| Nebraska
| 34 || 16 || 24.3 || .389 || .267 || .792 || 1.9 || 2.4 || 1.2 || .1 || 8.6
|-
| style="text-align:left;"| 2016–17
| style="text-align:left;"| Nebraska
| 31 || 29 || 31.6 || .417 || .397 || .810 || 3.0 || 2.6 || 1.6 || .1 || 13.0
|-
| style="text-align:left;"| 2017–18
| style="text-align:left;"| Nebraska
| 33 || 32 || 29.7 || .347 || .291 || .780 || 3.3 || 3.2 || 1.4 || .2 || 10.5
|-
| style="text-align:left;"| 2018–19
| style="text-align:left;"| Nebraska
| 36 || 36 || 34.5 || .414 || .383 || .791 || 4.1 || 3.1 || 1.1 || .1 || 13.6
|- class="sortbottom"
| style="text-align:center;" colspan="2"| Career
| 134 || 113 || 30.1 || .393 || .349 || .793 || 3.1 || 2.9 || 1.3 || .1 || 11.4

Professional career
After going undrafted in the 2019 NBA draft, Watson Jr. signed his first professional contract overseas with Lavrio of the Greek Basket League, on August 9, 2019. In 20 games, he averaged 8.0 points, 1.7 rebounds, and 1.8 assists. 

On February 16, 2021, Watson signed with another Greek Basket League club, Kolossos Rodou, replacing Ty Lawson. In 8 games, he averaged 8.0 points, 2.6 rebounds and 2.0 assists per game.

In August 2021, Watson signed with reigning Icelandic champions Þór Þorlákshöfn. On 2 October 2021, he had 16 points, 11 rebounds and 8 assists in Þór's 113–100 win against Njarðvík in the Icelandic Super Cup.

On August 16, 2022, Watson signed with Trefl Sopot of the Polish Basketball League (PLK). On December 21, he left the club on a mutual agreement.

On December 22, 2022, Watson signed with CBet Jonava of the Lithuanian Basketball League (LKL).

Personal life
Watson is the son of Sabrina Watson and Glynn Watson Sr. He has two older brothers (DeAndre and Demetri McCamey) and two sisters (Kiera and Monique). His girlfriend, Megan Gamble, was a star basketball player at her alma mater West Texas A&M University. Older brothers DeAndre and Demetri both also starred at St. Joseph High School. Demetri was a three-time All-Big Ten pick at the University of Illinois, earning first-team honors in 2009-10.

St. Joseph High School had the distinction of being the only school which had produced a pair of 1,000-point scorers for Nebraska, as Clifford Scales (1988–91) and Carl Hayes (1990-92) both played for Coach Gene Pingatore. Scales and Hayes both scored 1,136 points at Nebraska and played major roles in the Huskers’ school-record 26-win team in 1990-91.  Now St. Joseph High School can claim a trio of 1,000-point scorers for Nebraska.  On February 13, 2018, Watson joined the club, going over 1,000 points for his career.

References

External links
Nebraska bio
Sports-Reference.com profile
ESPN.com profile
Profile at Icelandic Basketball Association

1997 births
Living people
American expatriate basketball people in Greece
American expatriate basketball people in Iceland
American expatriate basketball people in Lithuania
American expatriate basketball people in Poland
American men's basketball players
Basketball players from Chicago
Nebraska Cornhuskers men's basketball players
Kolossos Rodou B.C. players
Lavrio B.C. players
Point guards
Glynn Watson Jr.
Glynn Watson Jr.